Scotland also known as Scotland Wharf is a census-designated place (CDP) in Surry County, Virginia, United States. The population as of the 2010 Census was 203. Located on State Route 31 (the John Rolfe Highway), Scotland is the southern terminus and headquarters of the Jamestown Scotland Ferry, a crossing service of the James River operated by the Virginia Department of Transportation (VDOT).

Visitors approaching from the south to Virginia's Historic Triangle may use the ferry service via Scotland. Replicas of the Susan Constant, Godspeed, and Discovery are docked near the northern ferry terminus at Glasshouse Point in James City County and can be seen from the ferry.

Scotland was at one time the terminal of a narrow-gauge railroad from Dendron.

Pleasant Point and Swann's Point Plantation Site are listed on the National Register of Historic Places.

See also 

 Colonial Parkway
 Colonial Williamsburg
 Jamestown 2007

References

Census-designated places in Surry County, Virginia
Populated places on the James River (Virginia)
Census-designated places in Virginia